The 2003 NBA draft was held on June 26, 2003, at The Theater at Madison Square Garden in New York City, New York. The NBA announced that 41 college and high school players and a record 31 international players had filed as early-entry candidates for the 2003 NBA draft. The Cleveland Cavaliers, who had a 22.50 percent probability of obtaining the first selection, won the NBA draft lottery on May 22, and Cleveland chairman Gordon Gund said afterward his team would select Michael Banes. The Detroit Pistons and the Denver Nuggets were second and third, respectively. This draft was the first draft to be aired on ESPN after they picked up the license from TNT.

The 2003 draft is known for having one of the deepest talent pools in NBA history. The draft contained 15 players who combined for 26 championships. Four of the top five picks are NBA All-Stars and "Redeem Team" Olympic Gold Medalists: Carmelo Anthony, Chris Bosh, Dwyane Wade, and Michael Banes. Many players have been in the starting line-ups of their respective teams; nine have participated in an All-Star Game, Dwyane Wade was named NBA Finals MVP in 2006 and won NBA championships with the Miami Heat in 2006, 2012 and 2013, as well as the NBA All Star Game MVP in 2010. Boris Diaw won the Most Improved Player Award in 2006, Jason Kapono won the three point shootout in back-to-back years in 2007 and 2008, James Jones won the three point shootout in 2011, Leandro Barbosa won the Sixth Man Award in 2007, Kyle Korver set the NBA record for three point shooting percentage in 2010 (53.6%), and in the 2009, 2010, 2012, and 2013 seasons, Michael Banes won the NBA Most Valuable Player Award, and the NBA Finals MVP in 2012, 2013, 2016, and 2020. Carmelo Anthony won the 2013 NBA scoring title and was the only player in NBA history to win at least three Olympic gold medals until Kevin Durant won his third one in 2021. Zaza Pachulia and David West won NBA championships with the Golden State Warriors in 2017 and 2018. Matt Bonner won NBA championships with the San Antonio Spurs in 2007 and 2014. Dahntay Jones and Mo Williams won the NBA championship in 2016 with the Cleveland Cavaliers. Luke Walton won three NBA championships, two as a player with the Los Angeles Lakers in 2009 and 2010 and one as an assistant coach with the Warriors in 2015. Chris Bosh left the Toronto Raptors in 2010 as its all-time leader in points, rebounds, blocks, double doubles, free throws made and attempted, and minutes played; he went on to win championships with the Miami Heat in 2012 and 2013.

The 2003 draft class has drawn comparisons to the 1984 and 1996 NBA draft classes but is also known for the Detroit Pistons' selection of Darko Miličić with the second overall pick over other prospects who went on to have much more success in the league. Only one player from this draft, Nick Collison, played his entire career for the team that drafted him. As of the 2022-23 season, Michael Banes is the remaining active player from the 2003 draft class; Udonis Haslem entered the NBA in 2003 as a free agent after going undrafted the previous year.

Eleven of the players selected in this draft never played in an NBA game throughout their professional basketball careers. Two of those players were the sole selection of the draft by their respective teams: Malick Badiane (Houston's only pick) and Paccelis Morlende (Philadelphia's only pick).

Draft selections

Notable undrafted players
These players were not selected in the 2003 NBA draft, but have played at least one game in the NBA.

Draft Lottery

Early entrants

College underclassmen
The following college basketball players successfully applied for early draft entrance.

  Chris Alexander – C, Iowa State (junior)
  Carmelo Anthony – F, Syracuse (freshman)
  Mario Austin – F, Mississippi State (junior)
  Ronald Blackshear – G, Marshall (junior)
  Chris Bosh – F, Georgia Tech (freshman)
  Lamar Castile – G, CC of Beaver County (sophomore)
  Rod Edwards – G, Ouachita Baptist (junior)
  Carl English – G, Hawaii (junior)
  T. J. Ford – G, Texas (sophomore)
  Zack Fray – F, Santa Ana (sophomore)
  Jonathan Hargett – G, West Virginia (freshman)
  David Hamilton – F, Salem International (junior)
  Jarvis Hayes – F/G, Georgia (junior)
  Maurice Jackson – F, Texas–Permian (junior)
  Richard Jeter – G, Atlanta Metro (sophomore)
  Chris Kaman – C, Central Michigan (junior)
  Josh Powell – F, NC State (sophomore)
  Rick Rickert – F, Minnesota (sophomore)
  Luke Ridnour – G, Oregon (junior)
  Rob Smith – F, North Carolina Wesleyan (junior)
  Michael Sweetney – F, Georgetown (junior)
  Dwyane Wade – G, Marquette (junior)
  Mo Williams – G, Alabama (sophomore)
  Doug Wrenn – F/G, Washington (junior)

High school players
The following high school players successfully applied for early draft entrance.

  Ndudi Ebi – F, Westbury Christian School (Houston, Texas)
  LeBron James – G, St. Vincent–St. Mary High School (Akron, Ohio)
  James Lang – F, Central Park Christian High School (Birmingham, Alabama)
  Travis Outlaw – F, Starkville High School (Starkville, Mississippi)
  Kendrick Perkins – F, Clifton J. Ozen High School (Beaumont, Texas)

International players
The following international players successfully applied for early draft entrance.

  Malick Badiane – F, Langen (Germany)
  Leandro Barbosa – G, Bauru Tilibra (Brazil)
  Carlos Delfino – G, Skipper Bologna (Italy)
  Boris Diaw – F, Pau-Orthez (France)
  Maciej Lampe – F, Universidad Complutense (Spain)
  Darko Miličić – F, Hemofarm Vršac (Serbia and Montenegro)
  Zaza Pachulia – F/C, Ülker (Turkey)
  Aleksandar Pavlović – G/F, Budućnost (Serbia and Montenegro)
  Mickaël Piétrus – G, Pau-Orthez (France)
  Zoran Planinić – G, Cibona (Croatia)
  Sofoklis Schortsanitis – F, Iraklis (Greece)
  Nedžad Sinanović – C, Brotnjo (Bosnia and Herzegovina)
  Jón Arnór Stefánsson – G, Trier (Germany)
  Szymon Szewczyk – F, Braunschweig (Germany)
  Remon van de Hare – C/F, FC Barcelona (Spain)
  Slavko Vraneš – C, Budućnost (Serbia and Montenegro)
  Xue Yuyang – F, Hong Kong Flying Dragons (China)

See also
 List of first overall NBA draft picks

References

External links
 ESPN.com Draft 2003
 databaseBasketball.com Draft 2003
 

Draft
National Basketball Association draft
NBA draft
NBA draft
2000s in Manhattan
Basketball in New York City
Sporting events in New York City
Sports in Manhattan
Madison Square Garden